Steve Henson (born March 30, 1959) is an American politician from the state of Georgia. A member of the Democratic Party, Henson was a member of the Georgia State Senate. He served as Minority Leader from 2011 to 2021.

Education 
Henson attended elementary school and high school in DeKalb county. He received a bachelor's degree in economics from the University of Georgia.

Political career

Georgia State Senate – District 55 
Henson was elected to the State Senate in 1991 where he represented Stone Mountain. He was re-elected three times representing his senate district from 1991 to 1999.

Georgia Labor Commissioner race 
Henson ran for the Georgia Labor Commissioner in 1998. He ran on his experience with job training. He lost in the Democratic primary run-off.

Georgia State Senate – District 41 
Henson was elected to the Senate District 41 in 2002 where he represents Tucker. On June 20, 2011, he was elected as the Senate Minority leader.

In 2011, Henson criticized the Republican majority for passing HB 1198 stating, "The Republican strategy is to make the tax system as regressive as possible. I can’t believe they did this. They have an insensitivity to the people, and you would think that would not be the case in these tough economic times." In December 2012, Henson criticized the appointment of Chip Rogers by the Governor Nathan Deal to a high-level position with the Georgia Public Broadcasting. Henson stated, "I’m just amazed the governor once again tried to pick someone who he has political contacts to and lacks professionalism for the job. … Chip Rogers couldn’t win re-election as majority leader, he had the banking problems, problems working with the gambling company. Now, he gets promoted to a job at Georgia public television. It’s amazing."

In his 2018 run for re-election he won his seat. On July 10, 2019, Henson announced that he would not run for re-election to the Senate.

References

External links
 
 
 Legislative page
 Twitter account
 Official website of Sen. Henson

1959 births
2020 United States presidential electors
21st-century American politicians
Democratic Party Georgia (U.S. state) state senators
Living people
People from Stone Mountain, Georgia
Politicians from Indianapolis
University of Georgia alumni